Joseph C. Dylkes, also referred to as the Leatherwood God, was a messianic figure in the early settlement of the Ohio Country in the United States.

Very little is known about Dylkes. Details about his birth, as well as information regarding his whereabouts following his enigmatic disappearance remain apocryphal.

Dylkes achieved notoriety in August 1828, at a camp meeting near a chapel known as the Leatherwood Church in Salesville, Ohio. On a Sunday afternoon, the United Brethren minister John Crum was preaching to a large congregation when a voice shouted "Salvation" followed by a strange sound, taken by all who heard it to be the snort of a horse.

Everyone was taken by surprise and turned to see a stranger dressed in a black broadcloth suit, frock coat, white cravat, and yellow beaver hat. He appeared to be between the ages of 45 and 50 and wore long black hair.

The stranger was hosted by some members of that congregation. He attended various religious meetings, and sometimes preached.  Displaying knowledge of the Bible, he started to declare himself a celestial being, and finally claimed he was the Messiah come to establish a kingdom that would never end. His assertion of immortality was bolstered by claims that no one could harm him or touch a single hair of his head.

Some families accepted his claims and became his followers, stirring controversy in the Ohio valley. A mob bent on discrediting him came to a religious service in the home of a Dylkes follower and tore out a considerable lock of his hair to demonstrate his mortality.

Dylkes was taken before the local Squire to be charged but was released on the grounds that it "was not a crime to be a god." Dylkes took refuge in a farm belonging to one of his followers and ultimately declared he was going to Philadelphia to establish a "New Jerusalem." During the trip he disappeared without a trace.

A few of his believers, such as Michael Brill and Robert McCormick, died believing in Dylkes. 

     They call him [the leatherwood god] due to the fact that Dylkes would place rocks in the [Leatherwood Creek] to see as if he was walking on water. He placed them in certain to where people couldn’t see him walking in the rocks. Everyone thought he was Jesus because he was “waking” on water.

     It wasn’t until months later, 3 teenage boys went down to the creek and found the rocks he would walk on. They moved the rocks and one day, Dylkes was going to demonstrate on how he could “walk” on water. Seconds later, he fell into the creek and from that point on, everyone knew he was a fake.

See also
 List of messiah claimants
 Messiah complex

Sources
 Howells, William Dean (1837–1920) - ""

History of Christianity in the United States
Christian revivals
19th-century Christians
Self-declared messiahs
Guernsey County, Ohio
Year of birth unknown
Year of death unknown